The Internal Security Act 1960 (abbreviated ISA) was a preventive detention law in force in Malaysia.  The legislation was enacted after the Federation of Malaya gained independence from Britain in 1957.  The ISA allows for detention without trial or criminal charges under limited, legally defined circumstances.  On 15 September 2011, the Prime Minister of Malaysia, Najib Razak said that this legislation will be repealed and replaced by two new laws. The ISA was replaced and repealed by the Security Offences (Special Measures) Act 2012 which has been passed by Parliament and given the royal assent on 18 June 2012. The Act came into force on 31 July 2012.

Structure
The Internal Security Act 1960 was consisted of 4 Parts containing 85 sections and 3 schedules (including 21 amendments).
 Part I: Preliminary
 Part II: General Provisions Relating to Internal Security
 Chapter I: Prohibition of Organizations and Associations of a Political or Quasi-Military Character and Uniforms, etc.
 Chapter II: Powers of Preventive Detention
 Chapter III: Special Powers Relating to Subversive Publications, etc.
 Chapter IV: Control of Entertainments and Exhibitions
 Chapter V: Other Powers for the Prevention of Subversion
 Chapter VI: Miscellaneous
 Part III: Special Provisions Relating to Security Areas
 Chapter I: Proclamation of Security Areas
 Chapter II: Powers Relating to Preservation of Public Security
 Chapter III: Offences Relating to Security Areas
 Chapter IV: Powers of Police and others 
 Chapter V: General
 Chapter VI: Power to make Regulations
 Part IV: Miscellaneous Provisions
 Schedules

History
Preventive detention was first implemented in Malaya by the British in 1948 to combat the armed insurgency of the Malayan Communist Party during the Malayan Emergency. The Emergency Regulations Ordinance 1948 was enacted by the British High Commissioner Sir Edward Gent. It allowed the detention of persons for a period not exceeding one year. This ordinance targeted acts of violence and only imposed temporary detention. The Malayan Emergency ended in 1960 and the ordinance was repealed. However, preventive detention was retained and remains a feature of Malaysian law today. In 1960, the government passed the Internal Security Act (ISA) under the authority granted by Article 149 the Malaysian Constitution.

The stated purpose of the ISA was to deter communist activity in Malaysia during the Malayan Emergency and afterwards. The first Prime Minister of Malaysia, Tunku Abdul Rahman, defined the purpose of the act as to "be used solely against the communists...My Cabinet colleagues and I gave a solemn promise to Parliament and the nation that the immense powers given to the government under the ISA would never be used to stifle legitimate opposition and silence lawful dissent". The third Prime Minister, Tun Hussein Onn, stated at the same time that his administration had enforced the act only with a view to curbing communist activity, and not to repress "lawful political opposition and democratic citizen activity".

In response to criticism that the ISA was not democratic or was too open to abuse, the first internal security minister, Ismail Abdul Rahman, stated:

However, partly due to massive street protests involving the public and politicians from both sides which portrayed the ISA as draconian and unnecessary in view of Malaysia's progress to "developed nation" status, on 15 September 2011, Prime Minister Najib Razak announced that The Internal Security Act will be abolished. Two new laws will be introduced instead to safeguard peace and order.

Reform
The government is in the final stages of revising the Internal Security Act. Home Minister Datuk Seri Hishammuddin Tun Hussein has stated that ISA amendments will revolve around five areas – the length of detention, rights and treatment of detainees and their families, the power of the Home Minister, the use of ISA for political reasons and detention without trial. In revising the ISA, the government met with key stakeholders to discuss amendments. Hishammuddin and Home Ministry's officials met for about three hours with representatives from the Attorney-General's Chambers, the Bar Council, the Barisan Nasional Backbenchers Club, the National Council for Women's Organisations and the National Civics Bureau. The Home Minister said that during the discussions, all parties agreed that there should be a law in place to protect the people against terrorism and militancy. The Law Reform Committee set up to review detentions under the Internal Security Act (ISA) has submitted its amendment proposals to the Cabinet. Parliament is expected to conclude its review of the amendments during its current sitting.

Law

Some notable sections of the legislation include:

Section 73(1) Internal Security Act 1960:
"Any police officer may without warrant arrest and detain pending enquiries any person in respect of whom he has reason to believe that there are grounds which would justify his detention under section 8; and that he has acted or is about to act or is likely to act in any manner prejudicial to the security of Malaysia or any part thereof or to maintenance of essential services therein or to the economic life thereof."

Section 8 ISA: Power to order detention or restriction of persons.
"(i) If the Minister is satisfied that the detention of any person is necessary with a view to preventing him from acting in any manner prejudicial to the security of Malaysia or any part thereof or to the maintenance of essential services therein or the economic life thereof, he may make an order (hereinafter referred to as a detention order) directing that that person be detained for any period not exceeding two years."

Section 8(1) theoretically restricts detention to a period not exceeding two years but this limit is readily circumvented because under Section 8(7), the duration of the detention order may be extended indefinitely in increments of up to two years The extension of the detention order may be made on the same grounds as those on which the original order was based or on different grounds. In delivering the judgment of the Court, Steve L.K. Shim CJ (Sabah & Sarawak) in Kerajaan Malaysia & 2 Ors. v Nasharuddin bin Nasir (2003) 6 AMR 497 at page 506,  ruled that the powers extended to the Home Minister are valid under the Malaysian Constitution. In addition, preventive detention is also now allowed by the Dangerous Drugs (Special Preventive Measures) Act 1985 and the Emergency (Public Order and Prevention of Crime) Ordinance 1969. The Human Rights Commission of Malaysia (SUHAKAM) has recently recommended that the ISA be repealed and replaced by new comprehensive legislation that, while taking a tough stand on threats to national security (including terrorism), does not violate basic human rights.

A detenu can make representations against his/her detention if an order of detention has been made against the detenu by the Minister under Section 8(1) of the ISA but under Section 73 however, the detenu seems to have no such right. Generally, the attitude of the Malaysian courts in respect of detention under Section 73 is that the courts have jurisdiction only in regard to  any question on compliance with the procedural requirements of the ISA and they seldom grant any substantive rights to the detenu.

Article 151 of the Malaysian Constitution gives to any person detained without trial (under the special powers against subversion) certain administrative rights. By the terms of Article 151 the authority, on whose order a person is detained, shall, as soon as may be, inform the detainee of the grounds of detention and the allegations of fact on which the order is based. The detainee shall also be given an opportunity within three months, of making representations against the order to an Advisory Board . The Advisory Board as the name implies is not a court. Its determinations are also mere recommendations that the government is under no obligation to accept. It may also be handicapped in its deliberations by the discretionary power of the government to withhold facts, the disclosure of which would, in the executive’s opinion be against national interest.

Any person may be detained by the police for up to 60 days without trial for an act which allegedly threatens the security of the country or any part thereof. After 60 days, one may be further detained for a period of two years each, to be approved by the Minister of Home Affairs, thus permitting indefinite detention without trial. In 1989, the powers of the Minister under the legislation was made immune to judicial review by virtue of amendments to the Act, only allowing the courts to examine and review technical matters pertaining to the ISA arrest.

The Reid Commission

‘Anti-government’ has at times been simply equated to being ‘anti-national’. In their Report, the Reid Commission (that was entrusted with the job of drafting the Merdeka Constitution) mentioned that the rights they were recommending had already been firmly established throughout Malaya and the guarantee of the fundamental rights would be provided by the mechanisms of: the Constitution being the supreme law; ‘the power and duty of the Courts to enforce these rights’; and, ‘the Courts would annul any attempt to subvert any of them whether by legislative or administrative action or otherwise’. [See Chapter IX, Fundamental Rights: Constitutional Guarantees, Para 161 p. 70 of the Report.]

Hardial Singh Khaira [Is it the ISA per se or the Interpretations Given by the Judiciary that Makes it Such a Draconian Law Now?], in his analysis of judgments related to the ISA maintains that 'not only have the Malaysian courts failed to annul the encroachments on the fundamental rights but their lack of judicial activism has in fact subverted those rights further. The failure of the Malaysian courts in relation to the ISA starts with the fact that they have generally accepted the subjective satisfaction of the executive for justifying the detention of an individual.' He further adds that the 'current approach of the Malaysian courts only serves to reduce executive accountability and respect for human rights under the rule of law.'

Release
Although the government may release detainees unconditionally, in some cases, it has required those being released to make a public confession on television and radio.

The case of Raja Petra Kamarudin, a well known blogger of Malaysia Today website, detained under the Internal Security Act on 12 September 2008 and was subsequently released 56 days later, was due to the habeas corpus filed by his lawyer citing unlawful detention by the Home Ministry. The High court, on 7 November 2008, over-ruled that detention and he was set free on the same day.

Criticism
Due to the alleged draconian nature of the ISA, several human rights organisations and opposition political parties have strongly criticised the act and called for its repeal. Foreign governments, notably that of the United States, have also pressured the government to repeal the act.

After the promise to repeal the ISA made in September 2011, there was nonetheless cynicism about the timing and delay of the repeal.

Domestic
Several opposition parties such as the Pan-Malaysian Islamic Party (PAS), the Democratic Action Party (DAP) and Parti Keadilan Rakyat (PKR) have spoken out against the ISA. Many of them have leaders or prominent members who were held under the ISA, such as Mohamad Sabu of PAS, Lim Kit Siang, Karpal Singh and Lim Guan Eng of the DAP, and Anwar Ibrahim of the PKR. Previously in the 1960s, the law had been denounced by such opposition leaders as Tan Chee Khoon, who said:

However, several politicians from the Barisan Nasional coalition, including its largest component party, the United Malays National Organisation (UMNO or Umno), that has governed Malaysia since independence have also criticised the ISA. The fifth Prime Minister of Malaysia, Abdullah Ahmad Badawi, went on the record in 1988 to state "If we want to save Malaysia and Umno, Dr Mahathir (then Prime Minister) must be removed. He uses draconian laws such as the Internal Security Act to silence his critics." The year before, he had also stated "Laws such as the Internal Security Act have no place in modern Malaysia. It is a draconian and barbaric law." In 2003 when he became Prime Minister, however, Abdullah called the ISA "a necessary law," and argued "We have never misused the Internal Security Act. All those detained under the Internal Security Act are proven threats to society." But opposition parties believe it is a threat to Umno rather than a threat to the country.

Prior to becoming Prime Minister, Mahathir had also adhered to a critical view of the ISA. In 1966, when Mahathir spoke out in support of the Internal Security (Amendment) Bill 1966 as a backbencher, he stated that "no one in his right senses like[s] the ISA. It is in fact a negation of all the principles of democracy." After becoming Prime Minister however the former premier had little if any hesitation using the law to suppress what he termed racialism but was seen by some as a move against his political opponents, the most notable of events being the infamous Operasi Lalang in 1987.

Recently former rapporteur to the United Nations Param Cumaraswamy, who is on record for his opposition of the ISA, suggested its use on former Malaysian Prime Minister Dr. Mahathir for alleged racial incitement by the latter at a speech in Johor Bahru on 17 May 2008, arguing that the reasoning of the former premier in the use of the law would be applicable against him now in light of his own racial excesses Such tit for tat justification however was condemned by various groups, notably PAS for inconsistency and double standards shown by the former rapporteur in his position as regards the ISA.

In Kota Kinabalu, United Pasokmomogun Kadazandusun Murut Organisation (UPKO) led by its Secretary-General Datuk Wilfred Madius Tangau, on 23 September 2008, joined its 3 other Barisan Nasional (BN) counterparts MCA, Gerakan and MIC, petitioning government review of ISA. Madius said the party supports former de facto Law Minister Datuk Zaid Ibrahim's position that the ISA should only be used against those who posed a threat to national security, such as terrorists: "Clearly in the case of Seputeh MP, Teresa Kok, Raja Petra Kamaruddin, and Sin Chew Daily reporter, Tan Hoon Cheng, there are so many other public order laws that can be used against them if, at all, there is a case to do so."

Notable uses of the ISA

Since 1960 when the Act was enacted, thousands of people including trade unionists, student leaders, labour activists, political activists, religious groups, academicians, NGO activists have been arrested under the ISA. Many political activists in the past have been detained for more than a decade.

As of 2005, 10,662 people have been arrested under the ISA in the previous 44 years, 4,139 were issued with formal detention orders and 2,066 were served with restriction orders governing their activities and where they live. In addition, 12 people were executed for offences under the ISA between 1984 and 1993.
Source: Figures were provided in a written answer by Prime Minister Abdullah Ahmad Badawi, who is also Minister for Internal Security, to parliamentary opposition leader Lim Kit Siang, whose statement was quoted by AFP in newsreports dated 3 February 2005

The ISA has been consistently used against people who criticise the government and defend human rights. Known as the "white terror", it has been the most feared and despised, yet convenient tool for the state to suppress opposition and open debate. The Act is seen by some as an instrument maintained by the ruling government to control public life and civil society.

The ISA was used extensively during the 1987 Operation Lalang in which Opposition members were silenced by the UMNO government through the use of ISA. Many opposition leaders were detained and the ISA was also used to detain Anwar Ibrahim.

The ISA was also used against militants. In August 2011, 3 Indian nationals who were members of the Babbar Khalsa International were arrested and deported. A Jemaah Islamiah member arrested in 2009 under the ISA was deported to Indonesia.

One of the most recent application of ISA was against Hindu activists belonging to the group HINDRAF who voiced out against the government policies that resulted in Malaysian Indians being marginalised and sidelined from the country's development. In response, Prime Minister Abdullah Ahmad Badawi personally signed the detention order that allows the leaders of HINDRAF to be detained without trial for two years, with the option for the detention order to be renewed indefinitely.

The government of Prime Minister Najib Razak has used the similar Emergency Ordinance on several occasions.

Repeal
Prime Minister Najib Razak first announced the proposed repeal of the ISA on 15 September 2011 when he claimed that the repeal was made "to accommodate and realise a mature, modern and functioning democracy; to preserve public order; enhance civil liberty and maintain racial harmony." The ISA is to be repealed and replaced by the Security Offences (Special Measures) Act 2012 which was passed and given the royal assent on 18 June 2012 but is not yet in force as of July 2012 as it is still waiting for the date of commencement to be announced by the Minister of Home Affairs, Hishammuddin Hussein. On 9 July 2012, Najib Razak was reported to have said that the ISA was scrapped because it did not help the ruling government politically.

See also
 Security and Public Order Division
 Internal Security Act (Singapore), the same Act extended to Singapore
 Kamunting Detention Centre (KEMTA)
 Operation Lalang
 Police (Malaysia) Act 1967

Notes and references

Other references
 text of the Internal Security Act (Act 82) at the Attorney General's website
 Chow, Kum Hor (6 November 2005). "9/11 changed Hu's view of ISA". New Sunday Times, p. 8–9.
 Kamaruddin, Raja Petra (31 October 2005). "A taste of one’s own medicine". Malaysia Today.
 Kamaruddin, Raja Petra (4 November 2005). "The true meaning of political doublespeak". Malaysia Today.
 Khaira, Hardial Singh, Preventive Detention: Part I – Constitutional Rights and the Executive, [2007] 1 MLJ lxiii; [2007] 1 MLJA 63
 Khaira, Hardial Singh, Preventive Detention: Part II – Police Power To Arrest And Detain Pending Enquiries [2007] 4 MLJ cxxxii; [2007] 4 MLJA 132
 mytwosens.blogspot.com
 (September 1999) "Document – Malaysia: Human rights undermined: Restrictive laws in a parliamentary democracy", Chapter 4. Amnesty International.

External links
 Internal Security Act 1960 
 Jeffrey Kitingan a Sabahan politician under ISA detainee stories by Nilakrisna James, ‘Enlightened’ Jeffrey recalls ISA’s cruelty , The Free Malaysia Today. 29 September 2011.

1960 in law
1960 in Malaya
Politics of Malaysia
Human rights in Malaysia
Repealed Malaysian legislation
Terrorism in Malaysia